Kamashady (Qamaşiźe) is a rural locality (a village) in Sultanbekovsky Selsoviet, Askinsky District, Bashkortostan, Russia. The population was 10 as of 2010. There are 2 streets.

Geography 
Kamashady is located 44 km east of Askino (the district's administrative centre) by road. Churashevo is the nearest rural locality.

References 

Rural localities in Askinsky District